The Bob Crosby Show can refer to any of several old-time radio musical variety program in the United States. They were broadcast on CBS, Mutual and NBC, with the first beginning in 1935 and the last ending in 1950.

Format
The program focused on music, with Crosby as the star and his Bobcats orchestra providing accompaniment. One of its characteristics was featuring "a different up-and-coming female vocalist" each week. Peggy Lee, Kay Starr and Jo Stafford were among those in that group. Radio historian John Dunning, in his reference book, On the Air: The Encyclopedia of Old-Time Radio, wrote, "The Bob Crosby Show, as such, was a product of the 1940s, but it had its roots in the big band era of the previous decade."

Personnel
Singer/bandleader Bob Crosby was the star of the program, with Johnny Mercer as the host. Other singers included Eileen Wilson and The Pied Pipers. Announcers included Les Tremayne, John Lund and Larry Keating. Writers included Carroll Carroll, David Gregory, Ben Freedman and John Murray.

Versions
The Bob Crosby Show was broadcast as shown in the table below.

Source: Musicmakers of Network Radio: 24 Entertainers, 1926-1962, except as noted.

See also
Club Fifteen

References 

1930s American radio programs
1935 radio programme debuts
1950 radio programme endings
CBS Radio programs
Mutual Broadcasting System programs
NBC radio programs